Qudejan (also Romanized as Qūdejān and Qud Jān; also known as Kūjūn and Qūrjān) is a village in Cheshmeh Sar Rural District, in the Central District of Khansar County, Isfahan Province, Iran. At the 2006 census, its population was 865, in 306 families.

References 

Populated places in Khansar County